The Thirteenth Chair can refer to:

 The Thirteenth Chair (play), a 1916 play by Bayard Veiller
 The Thirteenth Chair (1919 film), based on the play
 The Thirteenth Chair (1929 film), based on the play
 The Thirteenth Chair (1937 film), based on the play